Dr. Mire Hagi Farah Yusuf also known as Mire Hagi Farah Mohamed (1962 – 12 October 2006) was a Somali politician. In 2004, he was elected to the Transitional Federal Parliament of Somalia. During his tenure, he served as the Minister of Finance.

In 1997, he served as the district commissioner for the port city of Kismayo. During his tenure, floods along the Jubba River led to food shortages and the potential for "serious outbreaks of typhoid fever and cholera"; Mohamed promised "a secure environment for humanitarian operations" if international aid groups provided assistance.

References

Members of the Transitional Federal Parliament
Government ministers of Somalia
1962 births
2006 deaths
Mayors of places in Somalia